This is a list of Romanian football transfers for the 2007–08 transfer windows. Only moves featuring 2007–08 Liga I are listed.

Summer window
This list is incomplete. Please feel free to expand

Ceahlăul Piatra Neamţ
In:
 Constantin Schumacher – From FC Argeş Piteşti
 Narcis Răducan – From free
 Marius Iordache – From free
 Mircea Oprea – From FCU Politehnica Timişoara
 Rareş Soporan – Return to FCU Politehnica Timişoara
 Lucian Goian – From FC Dinamo București
 Florin Matache – From FC Dinamo București
 Vojislav Vranjković – from FC Dinamo București
 Alexandru Golban – from FC Dacia Chişinău
 Hamza Mohammed – from free
 Bruno Fernandes – From free

Out:

CFR Cluj
In:
 André Leão from SC Beira Mar for 250,000 euro
 Radu Marginean from Gloria Bistriţa from loan
 Eugen Trică from CSKA Sofia as a free agent
 Ibezito Ogbonna from Hapoel Tel Aviv as a free agent
 Gabriel Mureşan from Gloria Bistriţa for 150,000 euro plus 4 players
 Niklas Sandberg from AIK for 400,000 euro
 Amoreirinha from S.L. Benfica for 1,000,000 euro
 Nuno Claro from Paços de Ferreira as a free agent
 Gualberto Mojica from F.C. Paços de Ferreira from loan
  Cristian Fabbiani from Club Atlético Lanús for 1.600.000 euro
 Emmanuel Culio from Club de Deportes La Serena on loan until January 2008 for 100,000 euro
 Nicolas Canales from Gondomar SC on loan from Benfica

Out:
 Cosmin Tilincă to Gloria Bistriţa as a part of Gabriel Mureşan's transfer fee
 Cristian Coroian to Gloria Bistriţa as a part of Gabriel Mureşan's transfer fee
 Cristian Florin Dan to UT Arad for 110,000 euro
 Miguel A. Cuellar to Club Bolívar from loan
  Robert Roszel to UT Arad for 100,000 euro
 Martin Tudor to U Cluj for free
 Romeo Surdu to Steaua Bucharest for EUR 1,000,000
 Dorin Toma to Gloria Bistriţa until June 2008
 Vitinha to CS Otopeni until June 2008
 Alin Bota to CS Otopeni until June 2008
 Viorel Frunză to Ceahlăul Piatra Neamţ until June 2008
 Bogdan Bucurică to Gloria Bistriţa until June 2008

FC Dinamo București
In:
 Gabriel Boştină from Steaua București
 Daniel Opriţa from Steaua București
 Cornel Predescu, end of loan at Gloria Bistriţa
 Florin Bratu from FC Nantes Atlantique
 Valentin Năstase from Ascoli Calcio 1898
 Ianis Zicu from FC Internazionale Milano
 Hristu Chiacu from Wisła Kraków
 Flavius Stoican from FC Shakhtar Donetsk
 Silviu Izvoranu from Politehnica Ştiinţa Timişoara
 Lucian Goian back from loan at Ceahlăul Piatra Neamţ
 Mariano Fernandez from Nueva Chicago
 John Galliquio from Universitario de Deportes

Out:
 Florin Matache to Ceahlăul Piatra Neamţ
 Silviu Bălace to FC Vaslui
 Fabrice Fernandes released
 Valentin Nastase released
 Vojislav Vranjković to Ceahlăul Piatra Neamţ
 Sergiu Homei to FC Politehnica Iaşi

Farul Constanţa
In:
  Răzvan Stanca  – Returned From Sportul Studenţesc
  Bogdan Apostu  – Returned From UT Arad
  George Uşurelu  – Returned From Severnav Turnu-Severin
  Viorel Gheorghe  – Returned From FC Brașov
  Gaston Mendy – Signed From Estoril Futebol
  Emil Nanu  – Signed From Delta Tulcea
  Ştefan Ciobanu  – On loan From Delta Tulcea
  Paulo Monteiro – free agent
  Celestino – free agent
  Daniel Chigou – free agent
  Mihai Guriţă  – On loan From Steaua București
  Malá – free agent
Out:
  Mihai Guriţă – Transferred to Steaua București
  Cosmin Tilincă – Returned to CFR Cluj
  Marius Soare – On loan to Delta Tulcea
  Alexandru Măţel – On loan to Delta Tulcea
  Ionel Posteucă – On loan to Delta Tulcea
  Adrian Senin – Free to FC Brașov

FC Politehnica Iaşi
In:
 Cristian Lucian Munteanu from FC Sopron
 Iosif Kalai from Jiul Petroşani
 Sergiu Homei loaned from Dinamo București
 Ciprian Milea from Dunărea Galaţi
 Branko Baković free

Out:
 Martin Šarič – end of contract
 Claudiu Ionescu to Gloria Buzău
 Răzvan Ţârlea to Petrolul Ploieşti
 Dan Iurişniţi to CSM Focşani
 Irinel Ionescu to CS Otopeni

Politehnica Ştiinţa Timişoara
In:
 Marian Aliuţă free agent
 Arman Karamyan from Ceahlăul Piatra Neamţ
 Stelian Stancu from Steaua București for €250.000 ;
 Ionel Ganea from Rapid București
 Ciprian Dancia from Torpedo Moscow
 Dare Vršič from MŠK Žilina for €800.000 ;
 Alin Raţiu from Sportul Studenţesc for €200.000 ;
 Fabian Teuşan from Jiul Petroşani for €200.000 ;
 Dejan Rušič from NK MIK CM Celje for €200.000 ;;
 Sebastian Cojocnean from CS Otopeni for €400.000 ;
 Florin Sandu from CS Otopeni for €400.000 ;
Out:
 Ifeanyi Emeghara  to Steaua București for €1.200.000 ;
 Ştefan Grigorie to Rapid București
 Mircea Oprea to Ceahlăul Piatra Neamţ
 Adrian Olah to Universitatea Cluj for €200.000 ;
 Lucian Turcu to Gloria Bistriţa
 Ersin Mehmedovic to Unirea Urziceni
 Silviu Izvoranu to Dinamo București for €650.000 ;
 Mihăiţă Pleşan  to Steaua București for €820.000 ;
 Adrian Ilie to FC Politehnica Iaşi
 Cristian Scutaru to FCM Reşiţa
 Cristian Zimmerann to FCM Reşiţa
 Alexandru Popovici to FCM Reşiţa
 Adrian Poparadu to FCM Reşiţa
 Ionuţ Matei to FCM Reşiţa
 Rareş Soporan to FCM Reşiţa
 Fabian Teuşan to FCM Reşiţa
 Cristian Gălan to FCM Reşiţa
 Ioan Mera to FCM Reşiţa
 Gabriel Siminic to FCM Reşiţa
 Bogdan Străuţ to FCM Reşiţa
 Victor Rada to FCM Reşiţa
 Răzvan Riviş to FCM Reşiţa
 Florin Dochiţa to FCM Reşiţa
 Mircea Axente to FCM Reşiţa

FC Rapid București
In:
  Pierre Boya – Signed from FK Partizan Belgrade - €400.000 ;
  Vladimir Božović – Signed from OFK Beograd - €300.000 ;
  Stefan Grigorie – Signed from FCU Politehnica Timişoara -;
  Cesinha – Signed from Sporting de Braga for €600.000 -;
  Marcos Tamandaré – Signed from Sport Club Corinthians Paulista - for €100.000 ;
  Elinton Andrade – free;

Out:
  Valentin Badoi – Signed with Steaua București - for €550.000 
  Ionel Ganea – Signed with FCU Politehnica Timişoara ; – free
  Viorel Moldovan – Retired
  Ianis Zicu – End of loan
  Edel Bete – Loaned to Paris Saint Germain
  Ionuţ Alin Rada – Signed with Steaua București - for €800.000

FC Steaua București
In:
  Eric Bicfalvi – Signed from CS Jiul Petroşani – EUR 300,000;
  Valentin Bădoi – Signed from FC Rapid București – EUR 550,000;
  Mihai Guriţă  – Signed from FC Farul Constanţa – EUR 100,000;
  Cosmin Vâtcă  – Signed from FC Oţelul Galaţi – EUR 500,000;
  Adrian Neaga  – Signed from Seongnam Ilhwa Chunma – EUR 615,000;
  Ifeanyi Emeghara  – Signed from Politehnica Ştiinţa Timişoara – EUR 1,200,000;
  Paweł Golański – Signed from Korona Kielce – EUR 1,300,000;
  Alexandru Iacob  – Signed from FC Corvinul Hunedoara – EUR 400,000;
  Emil Ninu  – Signed from FC Progresul București – EUR 200,000;
  Róbinson "Rufay" Zapata  – Signed from Cúcuta Deportivo – EUR 1,000,000;
  Ionuţ Rada  – Signed from FC Rapid București – EUR 800,000;
  Dorel Zaharia  – Signed from Gloria Bistriţa – EUR 500,000;
  Mihăiţă Pleşan – Signed from Politehnica Ştiinţa Timişoara – EUR 1,500,000;
  Romeo Surdu – Signed from CFR Cluj – EUR 1,000,000;
Out:
  Daniel Opriţa – Signed with FC Dinamo București – free;
  Stelian Stancu – Signed with Politehnica Ştiinţa Timişoara – EUR 200,000;
  Sorin Paraschiv – Signed with Rimini Calcio – EUR 500,000;
  Élton – Signed with Al Nasr – EUR 500,000;
  Cyril Théréau – Signed with RSC Anderlecht – EUR 2,900,000;
  Klemi Saban – Signed with Maccabi Netanya – free;
  Gigel Coman – Signed with CFM Universitatea Cluj – EUR 100,000;
  Gabriel Boştină – Signed with FC Dinamo București – EUR 100,000;
  Mihai Guriţă – Signed with FC Farul Constanţa – free;
  Răzvan Ochiroşii – on loan to FC Gloria Buzău until May 2008;
  Cezar Lungu – on loan to FC Gloria Buzău until May 2008;
  Alexandru Iacob – on loan to FC Gloria Buzău until May 2008;
  Alexandru Tudose – on loan to FC Gloria Buzău until May 2008;
  Alin Liţu – on loan to FC Gloria Buzău until May 2008;
  Valentin Simion – on loan to FC Gloria Buzău until May 2008;

U Cluj
In:
  Mugur Bolohan – from Nea Salamina;
  Marius Baciu – from Oţelul Galaţi;
  Nemanja Jovanović – from Pandurii Târgu-Jiu - $175.000 ;
  Milan Jovanović – from Unirea Urziceni - €119.000 ;
  Martin Tudor – from CFR Cluj;
  Cosmin Cruşoveanu – from Corvinul Hunedoara - €40.000 ;
  Adrian Olah – from FCU Politehnica Timişoara - €200.000 ;
  Gigel Coman – from FC Steaua București - €100.000 ;
  Romik Khachatryan – from Unirea Urziceni - €50.000 ;
  Sergiu Costea – from FC Dinamo București.

Out:
  Kim Jong-Chun – to Yong-in FC;
  Ovidiu Stoianof – to Universitatea Craiova from loan;
  Dǎnuţ Şomcherechi – to FC Progresul București;
  Marius Popescu – retired;
  Codruț Lircă – to Ardealul Cluj;
  Thierry Ekwalla – to CSM Râmnicu Vâlcea.
 Bogdan Fărcaş on loan to Arieşul Turda;
 Dan Vǎscan on loan to CS ISCT;
 Cǎlin Vǎdana on loan to Arieşul Turda;
 Gheorghe Tǎut on loan to Bihorul Beiuș;
 Viorel Sântejudean on loan to CS ISCT;
 Adrian Borza on loan to CS ISCT;
 Tudor Dobrǎu on loan to unknown destination;
 Morar Marius on loan to Bihorul Beiuș;
 Vlad Petean on loan to unknown destination.

Winter window

Ceahlăul Piatra Neamţ
In:
 Haykel Guemamdia – from RC Strasbourg;
 Peter Omoduemuke – from Poli Timişoara;
 Ionuţ Matei – from Poli Timişoara;
 Martin Černoch – from Poli Iasi;
 Ivan Pecha – from FC Senec;
 Andrey Fedorenko – free;

Out:
 Alexandru Golban – free

CFR Cluj
In:
 Lars Hirschfeld – from Rosenborg BK - EUR 1.300.000;
 Sebastián Dubarbier – from Olimpo - EUR 755.000;
 Diego Ruiz – from Huachipato – free agent;
 Sixto Peralta – from River Plate – free agent;
 Mikael Dorsin – from Rosenborg BK – free agent;

Out:
 Gualberto Mojica – free agent;

Dinamo București
In:
 Gabriel Torje – from Politehnica Ştiinţa Timişoara for EUR 2.000.000;
 Osvaldo Miranda – from Gimnasia y Esgrima de Jujuy for EUR 800.000;
 Nino Pekarić – from FK Vojvodina Novi Sad for EUR 800.000;
 Blaze Todorovski from FK Sileks Kratovo;
 Igor Bugaev from FC Chornomorets Odessa;

Out:
 Mariano Fernandez;
 Ivan Gvozdenović;

Farul Constanţa
In:
 Mitar Pekovici form FK Čukarički Stankom;
 Chico from Varzim S.C.;
 Marx Santos from Palmeiras Youth;
 Dragan Gosic from FK Laktaši;
Out:
 Celestino Ilnhasse;
 Paulo Monteiro;

Gloria Bistriţa
In:
 Jasmin Trtovac to FK Novi Pazar;

Out:
 László Sepsi to S.L. Benfica for EUR 1,800,000;
 Ayres Cerqueira Simao to FC Botosani;

Gloria Buzău
In:
 André Nunes from Steaua Bucharest;
 Ghenadie Ochincă – free agent;

Out:
 Dino Eze to Steaua Bucharest;
 Kleyr Viera Dos Santos;
 Muller Santos da Silva;

Oţelul Galaţi
In:
 Stoyan Kolev;
 Gabriel Viglianti;

Out:
 Kim Gil-Sik;
 Pavel Byahanski;
 Eduard Ratnikov;
 Gheorghe Boghiu;

Pandurii Târgu Jiu
In:
 Mingote – from A.D. Lousada – free agent;
 Marco Soares – from U.D. Leiria – free agent;
 Jessui – from U.D. Leiria – free agent;
 Carlos Alexandre Cardoso – from C.F. Estrela da Amadora – free agent;
 José Anilton – from S.C. Braga – free agent;
 Carlos Pintassilgo – from Portimonense S.C. – free agent;
 Ibón Pérez Arrieta – from Swindon Town – free agent;
  Wandeir – from Associação Naval 1º de Maio – free agent;
 Diego di Gregorio – free agent;

Out:
 Edmílson
 Adnan Gušo

FC Politehnica Iaşi
In:
 Mohammed Manga – free agent;
 Domen Beršnjak – free agent;
 Andrej Pečnik – free agent;

Out:
 Martin Černoch – free agent;

FC Vaslui
In:
 Ousmane N'Doye – from Academica Coimbra;
 Galust Petrosyan – free agent;
 Hugo Luz – free agent;

Poli Timişoara
In:
 Valentin Badoi – from Steaua for free;
 Balázs Borbély – from Artmedia Bratislava ;
 Miloš Brezinský – from Sparta Prague ;
 Carlos Milhazes – from Rio Ave F.C. ;
 Elvio Raul Martinez – from Club Atlético Aldosivi ;

Out:
 Gabriel Torje – to Dinamo Bucharest for EUR 2.000.000;
 Jonathan McKain – free agent;

Rapid București
In:
 João Paulo – from Uniao Leiria for EUR 1,250,000;
 Ranko Despotović – from FK Vojvodina for EUR 1,200,000;
 Philippe Léonard – from Feyenoord for free;
 Andrejs Rubins – from FC Spartak Moscow for free;
 Vasco Matos – from S.C. Beira-Mar;

FC Steaua București
In:
 Andrés Mendoza – from FC Metalurh Donetsk for 'EUR 1,500,000;
 Dayro Moreno – from Once Caldas for EUR 1,400,000;
 Mahamadou Habibou – from R. Charleroi S.C. for EUR 500,000;
 José Moreno – from Club Atlético Independiente for EUR 200,000;
 André Nunes – from Zagłębie Lubin for EUR 100,000;
 Dino Eze – from Gloria Buzau;

Out:
 Valentin Badoi – to Poli Timişoara for free;
 André Nunes – to Gloria Buzau;

Universitatea Cluj
In:
 Cristian Silvăşan – free agent;
 Mircea Oltean – free agent;
 Andre Astroga – free agent;
 Fábio Bilica – free agent;
 Bayano – free agent;
 Pieter Merlier – free agent;
 Fabien Boudarène – free agent;

Out:
 Viorel Sântejudean on loan to Mureşul Deva;
 Adrian Borza on loan to Mureşul Deva;
 Cosmin Cruşoveanu on loan to Corvinul Hunedoara;
 Robert Villand – unknown destination;
 Ciprian Suciu on loan to Arieşul Turda;
 Sandu Negrean – unknown destination;
 Emil Szolomajer on loan to Arieşul Turda;
 Romik Khachatryan – to APOP Kinyras Peyias FC;
 Mamadou Zongo – free agent;
 Park Jae-hong – free agent;
 Mugur Bolohan – free agent;
 Marius Baciu – free agent.

Universitatea Craiova
Out:
 Mădălin Ciucă – free agent;
 Gabriel Velcovici – free agent;
 Constantin Gărgălie – free agent;
 Ovidiu Stoianof – free agent;

Unirea Urziceni
In:
 Pablo Brandán – free agent;
 Giedrius Arlauskis – free agent;
 Davidas Arlauskis – free agent;
 Jacob Burns – free agent;

2007-08
Romania
Transfers
Romania